Miss Earth Japan is a beauty pageant held annually in Japan. The titleholder represents Japan in the international Miss Earth pageant.

History
Miss Earth Japan, based in Shinjuku, Tokyo, is organized by IBG Japan (I Vesey Japan, Inc.) under its corporate name Miss Japan Institute of Earth General. The national director of the pageant is Osamu Sakata. The pageant was established in order to elect Japan's representative in the annual Miss Earth pageant, to further charity donations and philanthropic activities, and to promote environmental awareness and protection.

Japan was first represented in Miss Earth 2001 by Misuzu Hirayama, who was the first titleholder of Miss Earth Japan and won the Miss Friendship special award. 

In 2010, Japan first entered both in the semifinal and final round of the Miss Earth pageant, where Marina Kishira finished in the top 7 and won the Best in National Costume award in Miss Earth 2010.

Titleholders

Miss Earth
Color keys
The winner of Miss Earth Japan (MEJ) represents her country at Miss Earth. On occasion, when the winner does not qualify (due to age) for either contest, a runner-up is sent. The following are the names of the annual titleholders of Miss Earth Japan (MEJ), listed according to the year in which they participated in Miss Earth:

See also
Miss Universe Japan
Miss World Japan
Miss International Japan
Miss Japan
Miss Nippon

References

External links 
Miss Earth Japan

Japan
Beauty pageants in Japan
Miss Earth Japan
Recurring events established in 2001
2001 establishments in Japan